The Jewish name Peretz (Hebrew פרץ) may refer to the following people:

in the Hebrew Bible:
 Perez (son of Judah) in the Book of Genesis (also written as Peretz, Perets, Pharez)

as a modern given name:
 Peretz Lavie (born 1949), Israeli expert in the psychophysiology of sleep and sleep disorders, the 16th president of the Technion - Israel Institute of Technology, Dean of the Rappaport Faculty of Medicine
 Peretz Markish, (1895–1952), a Soviet Yiddish-language poet.
 Peretz Hirshbein, (1880–1948), a Yiddish-language playwright
 Peretz Smolenskin, (1842–1885), a Russian Jewish novelist

as a surname:
 Amir Peretz (born 1952), former Defense Minister and Labour Party leader in Israel
 Isaac Leib Peretz (1852–1915), modernist Yiddish language author and playwright
 Isabelle Peretz (born 1956), Canadian professor of psychology researching music cognition and amusia
 Jesse Peretz (born 1968), rock video director and son of Martin
 Malkiel Peretz (born 1943), Israeli chess master
 Martin Peretz (born 1938), Harvard University lecturer and former owner of The New Republic
 Moshe Peretz (born 1983), Israeli singer-songwriter
 Omer Peretz (born 1986), Israel U21 footballer and son of Vicky
 Rafi Peretz (born 1956), Israeli Orthodox rabbi who served as Chief Military Rabbi and is now Education Minister of Israel
 Vicky Peretz (1953–2021), Israeli international footballer
 Yitzhak Peretz (born 1936), Israeli politician who served as Deputy Minister of Industry, Trade and Tourism.
 Yitzhak Peretz (born 1938), Israeli politician who served as Minister of Internal Affairs and of Immigrant Absorption, and member on Israeli Chief Rabbinate Council

Other similar names
Perets
Perec
Perutz
Pérez (in Spanish), Peres (in Galician and Portuguese) and Peris (in Catalan) are typical Iberian family names with at least two distinct origins: One connected with the patronymic for "child of Peter" (son of "Pedro", "Pero", or "Pere" respectively), the other as the Iberian forms of the Hebrew family name Peretz. It was adopted as a family name by Sephardi Jews families during a time of religious intolerance (1318 c.e.) in the Iberian Peninsula. The name is also one of the names of the Messiah in Rabbinic tradition. It is a common family name among descendants of Spanish Jewish families that converted during the Inquisition.

Given names
Surnames